Rakesh Pal Singh (born 3 June 1959) is an Indian politician and a Madhya Pradesh Legislative Assembly member in the Keolari. He is member of the Bharatiya Janata Party.

He was appointed the district president of Seoni of the Bharatiya Janata Party.

Personal life
Singh was born in Seoni, Madhya Pradesh. He graduated with a Bachelor of Science degree from Dr. Hari Singh Gour University. He married Jyoti Singh, with whom he has one son Jayant Pal Singh and one daughter. He is organising Rama Navami rally from past 15 years in which more than 10000 people participate.

References

External links
 Rakesh Pal Singh

News 
 भाजपा मंडल कान्हीवाड़ा की नवनियुक्त मंडल कार्यकारणी की प्रथम बैठक में शामिल हुआ केवलारी विधायक राकेश पाल सिंह www.khabarsatta.com

Living people
1959 births
Bharatiya Janata Party politicians from Madhya Pradesh
Madhya Pradesh MLAs 2018–2023
People from Seoni district
People from Seoni, Madhya Pradesh